Wilhelm Altvater (12 August 1920 – 4 February 2001) was a German politician of the Social Democratic Party (SPD) and former member of the German Bundestag.

Life 
Altvater had been a member of the SPD since 1946. He was a member of the German Bundestag from September 22, 1960, when he succeeded the SPD North Rhine-Westphalia as state representative for the late Hugo Rasch, until 1961.

Literature

References

1920 births
2001 deaths
Members of the Bundestag for North Rhine-Westphalia
Members of the Bundestag 1957–1961
Members of the Bundestag for the Social Democratic Party of Germany